Prince Leopold (Poldi) of Bavaria (born 21 June 1943) is a member of the Bavarian royal house of Wittelsbach and a former champion race car driver. He descends from King Ludwig I of Bavaria in direct line and is a distant relative to the current head of the House of Wittelsbach, Franz, Duke of Bavaria and his brother, Maximilian, Duke in Bavaria. He also descends from Austrian Emperor Franz Joseph and his wife Elisabeth and from King George II of Great Britain, and is therefore a distant cousin of Elizabeth II. As a Roman Catholic he is excluded from the line for the British throne by the Act of Settlement 1701. He also descends from Isabella II of Spain, through her daughter, and Leopold's great-grandmother, María de la Paz.

Early life
Leopold (aka "Poldi") was born on Schloss Umkirch near Freiburg im Breisgau in Baden-Württemberg. He is the eldest son of Prince Konstantin of Bavaria and his first wife Princess Maria Adelgunde of Hohenzollern-Sigmaringen.

Since his parents separated soon after he was born, Leopold was raised by his grandparents Prince Friedrich von Hohenzollern-Sigmaringen and Princess Margarete Karola of Saxony. He grew up on Schloss Umkirch  together with his uncle Prince Ferfried (aka "Foffie") who is only two months his senior. It was there the Prince developed his love for cars and racing.

Marriage
On 21 October 1977 Prince Leopold married Ursula (Uschi) Möhlenkamp, the daughter of Wilhelm (Willi) Möhlenkamp and Ingeborg Brauckmann. The civil ceremony took place at Berg on Lake Starnberg in Bavaria. The religious ceremony followed a month later, on 19 November 1977 in Aufkirchen, Bavaria. Initially the union was considered morganatic, but on 3 March 1999 the marriage was decreed to be conditionally dynastic in accordance with the Bavarian house laws. The couple have four children:

 Prince Manuel Maria Alexander Leopold Jörg of Bavaria (b. out of wedlock in 27 December 1972, Starnberg, Bavaria, Germany); married Princess Anna of Sayn-Wittgenstein-Berleburg (b. 1978) in 2005. They have four children:
 Prince Leopold Maria Bengt Karl Manuel of Bavaria (b. 13 June 2007).
 Princess Alva Manuelle Maria Petra Yvonne of Bavaria (b. 05 January 2010).
 Prince Gabriel Maria Abraham Ludwig Theodor of Bavaria (b. 11 November 2014).
 Prince Joseph Carlos Maria Paul Melchior of Bavaria (b. 18 July 2019).
 Princess Maria del Pilar Birgitta Adelgunde Charlotte of Bavaria (b. 03 May 1978, Starnberg, Bavaria, Germany).
 Princess Maria Felipa Karin Marion Gabriele of Bavaria (b. 01 February 1981, Starnberg, Bavaria, Germany); married Christian Alexander Dienst (b. 1978) at Wies Church, Steingaden, Bavaria, Germany on 12 May 2012. They have three sons:
 August Maria Jürgen Leopold Dienst (b. 2013).
 Ferdinand Maria Konstantin Joachim Dienst (b. 2014).
 Otto Dienst (b. 2017).
 Prince Konstantin Eugen Alexander Max-Emanuel Maria Ludwig Ferdinand Leopold of Bavaria (b. 08 November 1986, Starnberg, Bavaria, Germany); married Deniz Kaya (b. 1990), at St. Moritz's Eglise au Bois church, St Moritz, Switzerland, on 01 September 2018.
 Prince Alexis of Bavaria (b. January 2020).

Later life
The Prince resides in a villa on the Lake Starnberg south of Munich, capital of Bavaria,  and is often seen in the company of the current Swedish King Carl XVI Gustaf whom he has known since his teens. He is a godfather of King Carl Gustaf's only son, Prince Carl Philip of Sweden. His maternal uncle Prince Johann Georg of Hohenzollern was King Carl Gustaf's brother-in-law. Prince Leopold is also involved with charitable causes helping disabled children, such as the Special Olympics and organizations promoting the use of animal-assisted therapy. This is in part, because his oldest daughter Princess Pilar has a form of autism, which she developed as a baby after she was given the wrong anesthetic during a heart surgery.

Motor Racing career
Prince Leopold started his career with rallying and in 1969 moved to touring car racing winning the North American Championships with Porsche in 1972. In 1984 he also took part in the legendary sports car endurance race 24 Hours of Le Mans together with Walter Brun and Bob Akin, finishing fourth. In 1986, Leopold became a factory driver for the Munich based car manufacturer BMW and although he retired from competitive racing in 1998, he remains involved with the BMW racing team as an adviser.

As well as competing in Europe and America, Prince Leopold competed in Australia also with a drive the 1984 James Hardie 1000 driving a Group A BMW 635 CSi for Frank Gardner's factory backed JPS Team BMW, partnering  Formula One World Champion Denny Hulme. In Australian touring car racing Group A was only a minor class introduced for the endurance races in 1984 before taking over as top class in 1985. After a troubled week which included losing a day after the Prince crashed the BMW at the top of The Mountain due to a lost front wheel, the pair finished the race in 15th place and 2nd in class, 4 laps behind the class winning TWR Rover Vitesse and 15 laps behind the race winning Holden Dealer Team Commodore. von Bayern (and Hulme) both had a new experience while racing at Bathurst in 1984. Their BMW was equipped with a racecam unit fitted in place of the left front headlight and both drivers were able to talk to the Channel 7 television commentary team while they were driving with the Prince saying at one point that "The race is very much fun for me".

Racing record

Complete World Sportscar Championship results
(key) (Races in bold indicate pole position) (Races in italics indicate fastest lap)

Footnotes

Complete 24 Hours of Le Mans results

Complete Deutsche Tourenwagen Meisterschaft results
(key) (Races in bold indicate pole position) (Races in italics indicate fastest lap)

Complete Bathurst 1000 results

Complete World Touring Car Championship results
(key) (Races in bold indicate pole position) (Races in italics indicate fastest lap)

Complete Japanese Touring Car Championship results
(key) (Races in bold indicate pole position) (Races in italics indicate fastest lap)

Complete Super Tourenwagen Cup results
(key) (Races in bold indicate pole position) (Races in italics indicate fastest lap)

Notes

References
 Die Wittelsbacher. Geschichte unserer Familie. Adalbert, Prinz von Bayern. Prestel Verlag, München, 1979
 Prinz und Demokrat. Konstantin von Bayern: Ein Gedenkbuch. Konstantin, Prinz von Bayern and Arens, Hanns. München; Wien : Langen/Müller, 1970
 Ich habe einen Traum. DIE ZEIT,  18 September 2003. Nr.39

Princes of Bavaria
House of Wittelsbach
1943 births
Living people
People from Breisgau-Hochschwarzwald
German Roman Catholics
German racing drivers
Deutsche Tourenwagen Masters drivers
24 Hours of Le Mans drivers
Racing drivers from Baden-Württemberg
World Sportscar Championship drivers
BMW M drivers
Japanese Touring Car Championship drivers
Schnitzer Motorsport drivers
RSM Marko drivers
Team Joest drivers